Evelia Sandoval Urbán (born 20 November 1964) is a Mexican politician affiliated with the New Alliance Party. As of 2014 she served as Deputy of the LIX Legislature of the Mexican Congress representing Jalisco.

References

1964 births
Living people
People from Oaxaca
Women members of the Chamber of Deputies (Mexico)
New Alliance Party (Mexico) politicians
Deputies of the LIX Legislature of Mexico
Members of the Chamber of Deputies (Mexico) for Jalisco